St. Wendel is an electoral constituency (German: Wahlkreis) represented in the Bundestag. It elects one member via first-past-the-post voting. Under the current constituency numbering system, it is designated as constituency 298. It is located in northeastern Saarland, comprising the Sankt Wendel district, the northern part of the Neunkirchen district, and parts of the Saarlouis and Saarbrücken districts.

St. Wendel was created for the inaugural 1957 federal election after the accession of Saarland to Germany. Since 2021, it has been represented by Christian Petry of the Social Democratic Party (SPD).

Geography
St. Wendel is located in northeastern Saarland. As of the 2021 federal election, it comprises the Sankt Wendel district, the Neunkirchen district excluding the Neunkirchen and Spiesen-Elversberg municipalities, the Lebach and Schmelz municipalities from the Saarlouis district, and the Heusweiler municipality from the Saarbrücken district.

History
St. Wendel was created in 1957, then known as Ottweiler – St. Wendel. In the 1965 through 1972 elections, it was named Ottweiler. It acquired its current name in the 1976 election. In the 1957 and 1961 elections, it was constituency 246 in the numbering system. In the 1965 through 1998 elections, it was number 247. Since the 2002 election, it has been number 298.

Originally, the constituency comprised the district of Sankt Wendel, the municipalities of Eppelborn, Illingen, Merchweiler, Ottweiler, and Schiffweiler from the Ottweiler district, and the Ämter of Lebach and Schmelz from the Saarlouis district. In the 1976 election, it acquired a configuration very similar to its current borders, but excluding the municipality of Heusweiler from the Saarbrücken district. It acquired its current borders in the 2002 election.

Members
The constituency was first represented by Leo Gottesleben of the Christian Democratic Union (CDU) from 1957 to 1972, followed by fellow CDU member Werner Zeyer from 1972 to 1980. Johannes Ganz of the CDU was then representative from 1980 to 1990. Hans Georg Wagner of the Social Democratic Party (SPD) was elected in 1990 and served until 2005. He was succeeded by fellow SPD member Rainer Tabillion for one term. Nadine Schön of the CDU was representative from 2009 to 2021. Christian Petry won the constituency for the SPD in 2021.

Election results

2021 election

2017 election

2013 election

2009 election

Notes

References

1957 establishments in West Germany
Constituencies established in 1957
Sankt Wendel (district)
Neunkirchen (German district)
Saarlouis (district)
Saarbrücken (district)
Federal electoral districts in Saarland